The Sea Battalion is a land formation of the German Navy. It was formed in Eckernförde on 1 April 2014, succeeding the Naval Protection Force and the Naval Force Protection Battalion, against a background of rapidly escalating tensions in Eastern Europe centering around Ukraine.

Structure 
The Sea Battalion is made up of around 1,100 sailors and structured into four companies plus support elements. Every company, led by a lieutenant commander (Korvettenkapitän, OF-3), is specialized in specific field of force protection.

 Seebataillon
 HQ
 S1
 S2
 S3
 S4
 S6
 medical support group
 coastal defence company (Küsteneinsatzkompanie)
 1st platoon
 2nd platoon
 3rd platoon
 4th platoon
 5th platoon (inactive)
 boarding company (Bordeinsatzkompanie)
 1st platoon
 2nd platoon
 3rd platoon
 4th platoon
 mine clearance diving company (Minentaucherkompanie)
 diver platoon (for seabased operations, e.g. aboard minesweepers)
 mobile platoon
 EOD platoon
 reconnaissance company (Aufklärungskompanie)
 surveillance platoon (including UAVs, diver detection sonar)
 HUMINT platoon
 sniper platoon
 NBC defence platoon
 support company (Unterstützungskompanie)
 technical support
 logistical support
 training centre
 beach master platoon (planned)

References

External links 
 Das Seebatallion (in German)

Germany
Military units and formations of the German Navy
Military units and formations established in 2014
Battalions of the Bundeswehr
2014 establishments in Germany